The 2013 Gagarin Cup playoffs of the Kontinental Hockey League (KHL) has begun on February 20, 2013, after the conclusion of the 2012–13 KHL regular season. The 2013 Gagarin Cup Finals started in April.

Playoff seeds
After the regular season, the standard 16 teams qualified for the playoffs. The SKA Saint Petersburg became the Western Conference regular season champions and Continental Cup winners with 115 points. The Ak Bars Kazan were the Eastern Conference regular season champions, finishing the season with 104 points. Lev Prague and Slovan Bratislava both made the playoffs for the first time in franchise history.

Western Conference 
SKA Saint Petersburg – Bobrov Division and Western Conference regular season champions, Continental Cup winners – 115 points
CSKA Moscow – Tarasov Division champions – 96 points
Dynamo Moscow – 101 points
Lokomotiv Yaroslavl – 92 points
Severstal Cherepovets – 85 points
Slovan Bratislava – 78 points
Lev Prague – 76 points
Atlant Moscow Oblast – 73 points

Eastern Conference 
Ak Bars Kazan – Kharlamov Division and Eastern Conference regular season champions – 104 points
Avangard Omsk – Chernyshev Division champions – 102 points
Traktor Chelyabinsk – 98 points
Metallurg Magnitogorsk – 93 points
Salavat Yulaev Ufa – 88 points
Barys Astana – 85 points
Sibir Novosibirsk – 84 points 
Neftekhimik Nizhnekamsk – 77 points

Draw
In each round, the highest remaining seed in each conference is matched against the lowest remaining seed. The higher-seeded team is awarded home ice advantage. In the Gagarin Cup Final series, home ice is determined based on regular season points. Each best-of-seven series follows a 2–2–1–1–1 format: the higher-seeded team plays at home for games one and two (plus five and seven if necessary), and the lower-seeded team is at home for games three and four (and if necessary, game six).

During the first three rounds home ice is determined by seeding number within the Conference, not position on the bracket. In the Finals the team with better seeding number has home ice advantage. If the seeding numbers are equal, the regular season record is taken into account.

Player statistics

Playoff scoring leaders
Updated on 17 April 2013. Source: khl.ru

  
GP = Games played; G = Goals; A = Assists; Pts = Points; +/– = Plus-minus; PIM = Penalty minutes

Playoff leading goaltenders
Updated on 17 April 2013. Source: khl.ru

GP = Games played; Min = Minutes played; W = Wins; L = Losses; SOL = Shootout losses; GA = Goals against; SO = Shutouts; SV% = Save percentage; GAA = Goals against average

References

2012–13 KHL season
Gagarin Cup